The Virginia Attorney General election of 2017 was held on November 7, 2017. The incumbent attorney general, Democrat Mark Herring, was expected to run for governor, but announced he would run for re-election instead. As only Herring and Republican John Adams qualified for their respective party primaries, the two automatically became their parties' nominees. In the general election, Herring defeated Adams to win a second term as Attorney General of Virginia.

Democratic primary

Candidates

Nominee
 Mark Herring, incumbent Attorney General

Republican primary

Candidates

Nominee
 John Adams, navy veteran, McGuire Woods partner, former law clerk for Clarence Thomas; former Assistant United States Attorney and White House aide

Failed to Qualify 
 Chuck Smith, former chair of the Republican Party of Virginia Beach, candidate for VA-03 and candidate for Virginia Beach City Council

Withdrawn
 Rob Bell, state delegate and candidate in 2013

Declined 
 Bill Stanley, state senator

Polling

General election

Candidates
Democratic nominee: Mark Herring, incumbent attorney general
Republican nominee: John Adams

Endorsements

Polling

Polls

Results

See also

2017 Virginia elections
2017 Virginia gubernatorial election
2017 Virginia lieutenant gubernatorial election
2017 United States gubernatorial elections

References

External links 
Official campaign websites
 Mark Herring for Attorney General
 John Adams for Attorney General
 Chuck Smith for Attorney General

Attorney General
2017
Virginia Attorney General
Virginia